László Kádár (born 31 March 1969) is a Romanian professional darts player who currently plays in World Darts Federation (WDF) events. He is a Apatin Open and Slovak Open champion. His other big achievements to date was qualified and advanced to the second round of the 2022 WDF World Darts Championship.

Career
Kadar has been playing at international World Darts Federation tournaments since 2010, made his debut at the 2010 WDF Europe Cup, where he was defeated by a whitewash in his opening game against Christian Demazure. In his subsequent 2010 Winmau World Masters debut, Kadar won his first game against Peter Holczer before losing to Dennis Harbour in the third round.

In 2011, Kadar took part in the 2011 WDF World Cup for the first time, winning his first game against Kevin Jacob 4–3 in legs. It was followed by the end against Hiroaki Shimizu in the second round. In the years that followed, Kadar only played the WDF tournaments in his region, primarily in Romania. He landed a bigger success at the 2014 WDF Europe Cup, where it went to the third round in singles competition, but lost 0–4 to Ross Montgomery. 

In 2017, he advanced to Last 16 stage at the Hungarian Classic for the first time. Two more rather meager years were then followed by a significant improvement in form from 2020. Kadar made it to the final of the Romanian Open, but had to admit defeat against Nick Kenny. In 2021, he snagged his first tournament victory at the Apatin Open, did it in a decider leg over Oliver Ferenc.

In 2022, he won the Slovak Open against Scott Marsh. As the best Eastern European player in the World Darts Federation rankings, Kadar qualified for the 2022 WDF World Darts Championship for the first time, where in the first round he beat Andreas Harrysson by 2–1 in sets. Kadar survived match darts and advanced to second round, but failed to win a set against Richard Veenstra.

World Championship results

WDF
 2022: Second round (lost to Richard Veenstra 0–3) (sets)
 2023:

Performance timeline

References

1969 births
Living people
Romanian darts players
Romanian sportspeople of Hungarian descent